Nuytsia is a monospecific genus containing the species Nuytsia floribunda, the Western Australian Christmas Tree.

Nuytsia may also refer to:

Nuytsia (journal), the journal of the Western Australian Herbarium

See also
 Nuyts (disambiguation)